The Hopewell Valley Regional School District is a comprehensive regional public school district serving students in pre-kindergarten through twelfth grade from three communities in Mercer County, New Jersey, United States. The municipalities that are part of this district are Hopewell Borough, Hopewell Township and Pennington Borough.

As of the 2019–20 school year, the district, comprised of six schools, had an enrollment of 3,467 students and 351.1 classroom teachers (on an FTE basis), for a student–teacher ratio of 9.9:1.

The district is classified by the New Jersey Department of Education as being in District Factor Group "I", the second-highest of eight groupings. District Factor Groups organize districts statewide to allow comparison by common socioeconomic characteristics of the local districts. From lowest socioeconomic status to highest, the categories are A, B, CD, DE, FG, GH, I and J.

Awards and recognition
In 2011, the district was named to the College Board's AP Honor Roll.  The honor roll consists of the 388 U.S. public school districts that simultaneously achieved increases in access to AP courses for a broader number of students and also maintained or improved the rated at which their AP students earned scores of 3 or higher on an AP Exam.

In 2004, the district was named to the American Music Conference's list of the "Best 100 Communities for Music Education in New Jersey".  The district has been recognized on multiple occasions for its high-caliber music and performing arts programs.

NAMM named the district in its 2009 survey of the "Best Communities for Music Education", which included 124 school districts nationwide.

The district's high school was the 16th-ranked public high school in New Jersey out of 322 schools statewide, in New Jersey Monthly magazine's September 2018 cover story on the state's "Top Public High Schools", after being ranked 39th in 2008 out of 316 schools. The magazine took into account factors such as class size, teachers with advanced degrees, and socioeconomic factors.

Schools
Schools in the district (with 2019–20 enrollment data from the National Center for Education Statistics) are:
Elementary schools
Bear Tavern Elementary School with 397 students in grades PreK-5
Christopher Turnbull, Principal
Hopewell Elementary School with 400 students in grades PreK-5
David Friedrich, Principal
Stony Brook Elementary School with 378 students in grades K-5
Steven Wilfing, Principal
Toll Gate Grammar School with 306 students in grades K-5
Jane-Ellen Lennon, Principal
Middle school
Timberlane Middle School with 820 students in grades 6-8
Nicole Gianfredi, Principal
Melissa Lauri, Vice Principal
Raquel Rivera, Vice Principal
Hopewell Valley Central High School with 1,097 students in grades 9-12
Patricia Riley, Principal
Anson Smith, Vice Principal
Courtney Underwood, Vice Principal

Administration
Core members of the district's administration are:
Dr. Rosetta D. Treece, Superintendent
Robert W. Colavita Jr., Assistant Superintendent for Business / Board Secretary

Board of education
The district's board of education, comprised of nine members, sets policy and oversees the fiscal and educational operation of the district through its administration. As a Type II school district, the board's trustees are elected directly by voters to serve three-year terms of office on a staggered basis, with three seats up for election each year held (since 2012) as part of the November general election. The board appoints a superintendent to oversee the day-to-day operation of the district. The board of education, whose members are elected by the Hopewell Valley community, has nine members allocated to each of the three municipalities based on population, with Hopewell Township assigned seven seats and both Hopewell and Pennington each assigned a single seat. 

Members of the board are:
Deb Linthorst, Hopewell Township, President
Jessica Grillo, Hopewell Borough, Vice President
Adam J. Sawicki Jr., Hopewell Township
Bill Herbert, Hopewell Township
John Mason, Hopewell Township
Jenny Long, Pennington Borough
Anita Williams Galiano, Hopewell Township
Deb O'Reilly, Hopewell Township
Andrea Driver, Hopewell Township

According to Business Practice 9000, the local board of education has full power to operate the local public schools in compliance with state and federal mandates and pertinent to the laws of the municipality. The board functions as a corporate body only when in session.

Controversy and sexual abuse allegations 
There have been several allegations made against the Hopewell Valley Regional School District. In 2015, Former Hopewell teacher Matthew Hoffman was found liable for repeated sexual abuse of a student in a classroom. Allegations against a current Hopewell Social Studies teacher were made in a court filing on October 31, 2019. Although initially issuing a press release defending the teacher, further investigation by the school found cause to immediately pull him from the classroom effective November 12, 2019.

References

External links
Hopewell Valley Regional School District

Hopewell Valley Regional School District, National Center for Education Statistics

Hopewell, New Jersey
Hopewell Township, Mercer County, New Jersey
Pennington, New Jersey
New Jersey District Factor Group I
School districts in Mercer County, New Jersey